is a Japanese photographer.

Born in Shinagawa, Tokyo, in 1941, Akiyama studied in the Faculty of Political Science of Waseda University and then went to Tokyo College of Photography, graduating in 1964. He became an assistant to Yasuhiro Ishimoto but very quickly turned freelance. With Haruo Satō, he created Wakai gunzō, a series of photographs of young people within crowds, taken close up with a wide-angle lens that won acclaim; it led to a series of collaborations with Satō.

Akiyama traveled to east and west Europe just before the destruction of the Berlin Wall; he also photographed carnivals in the West Indies at around this time.

Akiyama taught at Punjab College of Photography from 1970.

Books by Akiyama

Kokkyō Rurō. Tokyo: Heibonsha, 2010. .
Kūsatsu Dai-Tōkyō. Tokyo: Shōbunsha, 1991. .
Nihon kūchū kikō / Sky Landscape. Tokyo: Jiji Tsūshin, 1994. .
Kokkyō Rurō / Wandering about the Boundaries. 2 vols. Kyoto: Kyōto Shorin, 1998.  (vol. 1),  (vol. 2).
Nippon air scope: Tori no yō ni kaze no yō ni. Kyoto: Kyōto Shorin, 1999. .
Tokyo air scope: Kūchū ni sankyaku o tateru. Kyoto: Kyōto Shorin, 1999. .
 Farmer.  Tokyo: Tōseisha, 2000. .
 Nogyō o yarō!. Tokyo: Sankaidō, 2000. .

References

Nihon shashinka jiten / 328 Outstanding Japanese Photographers. Kyoto: Tankōsha, 2000. . P.20. Despite the English-language alternative title, all in Japanese.

Japanese photographers
1941 births
Living people
People from Shinagawa
Tokyo College of Photography alumni